The Requena Province is one of the eight provinces in the Loreto Region of Peru. It was created by Law No. 9815 on July 2, 1943 by president Manuel Prado Ugarteche. Its territory is part of the Amazon Rainforest; as such, it is characterized by high temperatures, heavy rainfall and a wide diversity of plants and animals.

Political division
The province is divided into eleven districts.

 Alto Tapiche (Santa Elena)
 Capelo (Flor de Punga)
 Emilio San Martín (Tamanco)
 Jenaro Herrera (Jenaro Herrera)
 Maquia (Santa Isabel)
 Puinahua (Bretaña)
 Requena (Requena)
 Saquena (Bagazan)
 Soplin (Nueva Alejandría)
 Tapiche (Iberia)
 Yaquerana (Angamos)

Notes

Provinces of the Loreto Region